Toke Reichstein (born 1970s) is a Danish economist and Professor at Copenhagen Business School. He is best known for his work on "Investigating the sources of process innovation among UK manufacturing firms."

Life and work 
Reichstein has obtained his BSc and his MSc in economics at the Aalborg University in 1999, and his PhD in economics at the Aalborg University in 2003.

After his graduation Reichstein was Research Associate at the Tanaka Business School of the Imperial College London from 2003 to 2006. In 2006 he moved to the Copenhagen Business School, where he was appointed Associate Professor in the Department of Industrial Economics and Strategy. In 2011 he was appointed Professor.

Reichstein research interests focuses on entrepreneurship and economics of innovation.

Selected publications
 Lars Alkaersig, Karin Beukel, Toke Reichstein. Intellectual Property Rights Management: Rookies, Dealers and Strategists. Palgrave Macmillan, 24 feb. 2015

Articles, a selection:
 Reichstein, Toke, and Ammon Salter. "Investigating the sources of process innovation among UK manufacturing firms." Industrial and Corporate Change 15.4 (2006): 653-682.
 Dahl, Michael S., and Toke Reichstein. "Are you experienced? Prior experience and the survival of new organizations." Industry and Innovation 14.5 (2007): 497-511.
 Laursen, Keld, Toke Reichstein, and Ammon Salter. "Exploring the effect of geographical proximity and university quality on university–industry collaboration in the United Kingdom." Regional studies 45.4 (2011): 507-523.

References

External links 
 Homepage of Toke Reichstein

1970s births
Living people
Danish business theorists
Aalborg University alumni
Academics of Imperial College London
Academic staff of Copenhagen Business School